Kolakaluri Enoch (born 1 July 1939) is an Indian writer, teacher, and former Vice Chancellor of Sri Venkateswara University, Tirupati. He was honoured by the Government of India, in 2014, by bestowing on him the Padma Shri, the fourth highest civilian award, for his contributions to the field of literature.

Biography

Kolakaluri Enoch was born in a family with meagre financial resources, to Ramaiah and Veeramma, in the small village of Vejandla, in Guntur district, in the present day Andhra Pradesh state of India. His higher education was at the Andhra University from where he secured BA (Hons) in 1959. During his college days, he received the first prize for short story, poem, and play in the annual competitions for three years consecutively, from 1957 to 1959. Subsequently, he joined Sri Venkateswara University, in the temple town of Tirupati, and obtained a PhD.

Kolakaluri Enoch started his career by joining Andhra University as a faculty member. He had a notable career which took him to the post of the Vice Chancellor of the Sri Venkateswara University, Tirupati, the institution from where he secured his doctoral degree.

Career and legacy
Kolakaluri Enoch has a fairly large body of work, which comprises 180 poems, 180 stories, 9 novels and 30 plays apart from other efforts on literary criticisms and Children's literature. Many of his works have been translated into other languages such as English, Hindi, Tamil, Kannada, and Malayalam. His works have been subjected to critical studies for educational purposes and nine PhDs and 5 MPhils have been reported to be based on them. One of his stories, Talalenodu (A Person without head), was a prescribed text book for intermediate course at Andhra University during the period from 1987 to 1995.

Enoch, belonging to a backward community, was also reported to be a social activist and, championed the cause of Dalits through his works. He was a member of the jury for T. V. Nandi awards of the Government of Andhra Pradesh in the year 1992.

Awards and recognitions
Kolakaluri Enoch was awarded the Padma Shri, in 2014, by the Government of India He has also received many other awards such as:
Awarded with the 29th Moortidevi Award by Bharatiya Jnanpith for his novel Ananta Jeevanam
 Telugu Bharati Puraskaram - C. P. Brown Academy, Alfa foundation, Hyderabad – 2010
 Andhra Pradesh Sahitya Akademi Award (for Adunika Sahitya Vimarsha Sutram) - 1998
 Andhra Pradesh Sahitya Akademi Award (for Munivahanudu) - 1988
 Andhra Pradesh Sahitya Akademi Award (for Urabavi (Short Story Arthology)) - 1986
 Mallemala Sahitya Puraskaram - Mallemala Trust, Kadapa – 2010
 Telugu Sakha Swarnotshava Puraskaram - S. V. University, Tirupati - 2009
 Duvvuri Ramanamma Puraskaram - DRW College, Gudur - 2009
 Viswavidyalaya Pratibha Puraskaram - Acharya Nagarjuna University, Guntur - 2007
 Life achievement Award - Siddhartha Kalapeetham, Vijayawada - 2006
 Telugu Bhashotsava Puraskaram - Government of Andhra Pradesh - 2004
 N. T. R. Lalitha Kala Puraskaram N. T. R. Foundation Trust, Hyderabad - 2008
 Sahiti Puraskaram - Potti Sreeramulu Telugu University - 1999
 Sahitya Academy Award Telugu for Vimarshini in 2018 
He is also reported to have received the Ambedkar National Literary Award (1997), Juluri Nagarajarao Literary Award (1977), Paidi Lakshmaiah Literary Award (1998), and Madras Telugu Akademi Literary Award (2001) Some of the educational awards received by him are:
 Best Teacher Award - Government of Andhra Pradesh - 1993
 Best Educationalist Award - All India Ambedkar Association, Andhra Pradesh - 1994
 National Integration Award - Government of Andhra Pradesh - 1994
 Best Educational Award - Delhi Telugu Association, New Delhi - 1998
Some of the titles conferred on him by local cultural bodies are the Andhra Shri by the Sri Saraswati Journal in 1961, Kalasaraswati by Kalavedika, Hyderabad in 1985, Sahiti Samrat by Kalarayam, Hyderabad in 1991 and Kathaka Chakravarti by Joshua Samithi, Vinukonda in 1999.

Literary contributions
Enoch is credited with over 180 poems, 180 stories, 9 novels and 30 plays. Some of his notable works are:
Poems

 Asha Jyothi
 Shara Mamulee
 Kulam Dhanam
 Nannu Kalagananivvandi
 Kalala Karkhana
 Tridrava Pathakam
 Cheppulu
 Adi-Andhrudu
 Merupula Akasam
 Kannitigonthu
 Voice of Silence 
 Nissabdaswaram

Dramas

 Key
 Jai Hind
 Manalanti Manishi
 Munivahanudu
 Sakshi
 Edugo Aesu Kristhu
 Needa
 Votlata
 The fifth Estate

One Act Plays

 Dristi (Collection of Playlets)
 Jyothi (Collection of Playlets) 
 Abhyudayam (Collection of Playlets)
 Radio Natikalu (Collection of Playlets)
 T. V. Natikalu (Collection of Playlets)
 Amma (Collection of Playlets) 
 K. E. Nataka Sahityam (Collection of Playlets)

Novels

 Samata
 Anatha
 Soundaryavati
 Sowbhagyavati
 Erulalo Virulu
 Ekkadundi Prasanthi?
 Rendu Kallu-Mudu Kallu
 Sarkaru Gaddi
 Anantajivanam
 Majimanishi
 Kalameghalu
 Stridarshanam (Collection of Novels)
 Dalitha Nivedanam (Collection of Novels)
 Samaja Sandarshanam (Collection of Novels)

Short Story Anthologies

 Gulabi Navvindi
 Bhavani
 Eda Jivitham?
 Uoorabavi
 Suryudu Taletthadu
 Kattadi
 Kolupulu
 Asprisyaganga
 Kaki
 Dalitha Kathanikalu
 Peddammagudi

Research Papers

 Telugu Vyasa Parinamam
 Telugu Basha Charitra
 Adhunika Sahitya Vimarsha Sutram
 Janapadula Sahitya Vimarsha
 Teluguloo Toli Navala
 Telugu Vyasam
 Telugu Vimarshanam
 Telugu Vachana Tattwam
 Mitra Samasame
 Punarukti Guname
 Telugu Sahityamloo Harijanulu
 Adhunikandhra Sahityamloo Muslimlu

Literary Criticism

 Telugu Vyasalu
 Sahityadarshini
 Sahitya Sandarshanam
 Samikshanam
 Samiksha Sahityam
 Pithika Sahityam
 Telugu Kathanika Parinamam
 Chinni Kayitala Vennela
 Telugu Navala Vikasam
 Sahitya Prayojanam
 Shudrakavi Shubhamurthi Vasucharitra Vaisisthyam

Translations

 New Testament - Kotha Odambadika 
 Kshamabhiksha – Itara Kathalu - Alms of pardon & Other Stories
 Votlata - The Game of Votes
 Anantajivanam - The Cyclone Endless
 Kanniti Gonthu - Shurpanakha Still weeps

Children's literature
 Amma - Dance & Music Playlets
Enoch's writings have been transalted into English, Kannada, Tamil, Malayalam, and Hindi. His works have been subjected to critical studies, both for literary and educational purposes.

References

External links

Further reading
 
 
 

1939 births
Living people
Recipients of the Padma Shri in literature & education
Writers from Andhra Pradesh
Educators from Andhra Pradesh
Sri Venkateswara University alumni
20th-century Indian poets
20th-century Indian dramatists and playwrights
20th-century Indian novelists
20th-century Indian short story writers
20th-century Indian translators
Indian literary critics
People from Guntur district
Telugu-language writers
20th-century Indian educational theorists
Recipients of the Sahitya Akademi Award in Telugu
Recipients of the Moortidevi Award